The women's 4 × 100 metres relay event at the 2011 Military World Games was held on 23 July at the Estádio Olímpico João Havelange.

Records
Prior to this competition, the existing world and CISM record were as follows:

Schedule

Medalists

Results

Final

References

4 x 100 metres relay
2011 in women's athletics